Beheshtabad (also Romanized as Beheshtābād) is a village in Shabkhus Lat Rural District, Rankuh District, Amlash County, Gilan Province, Iran. At the 2006 census, its population was 64, in 21 families.

References 

Populated places in Amlash County